Ingentidens is an extinct genus of chroniosuchid reptiliomorph from upper Permian (upper Roadian age) mudstone deposits of Dashankou locality, Xidagou Formation of China. It was first named by Jin-Ling Li and Zheng-Wu Cheng in 1999, from a mandible (IGCAGS V 363). The type species is Ingentidens corridoricus. The generic name means “large” (Inget in Latin) + “tooth” (dens), and the specific name referring to the region of Gansu, the Hexi Corridor where the type specimen was found.

References

Chroniosuchians
Permian tetrapods of Asia
Prehistoric tetrapod genera
Fossil taxa described in 1999
Fossils of China